Jean de Gliniasty (born 27 September 1948, Lyon) is a French diplomat and was Ambassador of France to Russia, from 2009 until October 2013. He presented his credentials to Russian President Dmitry Medvedev on 29 May 2009.

References

1948 births
Living people
Ambassadors of France to Russia
Sciences Po alumni
École nationale d'administration alumni